William Ingersoll may refer to:
William Ingersoll (actor) (1860–1936), American actor
William P. Ingersoll (philanthropist) (1885–1973), American philanthropist, owner of the William Ingersoll Estate